The Banda Sea pitta or two-striped pitta (Pitta vigorsii) is a species of bird in the family Pittidae. It is found in Indonesia.  Its natural habitat is subtropical or tropical moist lowland forest.  It is threatened by habitat loss.

References

 

Banda Sea pitta
Birds of Indonesia
Banda Sea pitta